Jampatune (possibly from Aymara jamp'atu, jamp'at'u frog, -ni a suffix to indicate ownership, "the one with a frog") is a mountain in the Vilcanota mountain range in the Andes of Peru, about  high.

Geography
It is situated in the Cusco Region, Canchis Province, San Pablo District, and in the Puno Region, Carabaya Province, Corani District. Jampatune lies west of the mountain Pomanota.

References

Mountains of Peru
Mountains of Cusco Region
Mountains of Puno Region